Colonel R. A. McGeorge was the 12th Commander of the Ceylon Defence Force. He was appointed in 1945 until 1946. He was succeeded by the acting Randolph Jewell Francis Mendis.

References

Commanders of the Ceylon Defence Force
20th-century British people